Veľké Lovce is a town and municipality in the Nové Zámky District in the Nitra Region of south-west Slovakia. Veľké Lovce is home to 2,079 people according to the 2004 census.

History
In historical records the first mention of the town is from 1236, Though the exact date the town was formed is unknown.

The territory of the town is enriched by an old monastery (Mariačalád) built in 1512 which served during most of the later medieval age and was in the patronage of monks of the Paulin order. The monastery consisted of two towers built over the church and the monks housing. Its library is also worth mentioning, for the fact that it held over 1100 books, but in 1784 they were transferred to Budin (present day Budapest). The monastery along with the order were canceled by Joseph II. The monastery was passed  on to the town's owner.

Until 1899 the town had two separate parts Velký Lót and Malý Lót. But due to a catastrophic fire the whole town was destroyed, it then changed the name and was known under the new name Lót. From 1938–1945 the town was a part of Hungary due to border changes in World War II. After the war the name changed to the final Veľké Lovce.

Geography
The municipality of Veľké Lovce is situated in the Nové Zámky district, Nitriansky region at an altitude of 189 metres and it covers an area of 25.846 km².. It lies on the bed of the Pohronská Pahorkatina, in a valley surrounded by forest from the northern and eastern side of the town.
The township belongs to the micro region named Termál, and it is situated only 5 km(3 mi)from the well known thermal water resort of Podhájska. There are many foreigners searching for this  water resort every year.

The town lies in the temperate zone and has a continental climate. Annual average temperature reaches around 10 °C (50.0 °F), with the warmest month being July with an average of 20 °C and the coldest January with -2 °C. Average annual precipitation is 556 mm.

Ethnicity
The population of the town is: 86% Slovak, 10% Hungarian, and 4% Romani.

Facilities
The town has a public library and a football pitch serving the needs of the football club TJ Velke Lovce. In 1996 a museum was erected inside the Cultural house. There are two churches in the town, the Reformed Christian church built in 1882 and the Roman Catholic church built 1904–1906. There's also a memorial for the men who gave their lives in the first and second world wars, it is in the local cemetery. In 2006, a social house for the elderly was opened. Recently, plans for a multi-purpose building housing town hall offices and a local doctor, new post office, and pharmacy have been discussed.

Events
Every summer the town participates in organizing concerts and provides support in many forms. Upon the few of the bands and artists that have held a concert in Velke Lovce are Desmod, Gladiátor, Verona and the hip hop band L.U.Z.A.

References

External links 
 Veľké Lovce – Nové Zámky Okolie

Villages and municipalities in Nové Zámky District